Pavel Landovský (11 September 1936 – 10 October 2014), nicknamed Lanďák, was a Czech actor, playwright, and director. He was a prominent dissident under the communist regime of former Czechoslovakia.

Biography
Landovský was born in Havlíčkův Brod in 1936, and after finishing his studies at the secondary technical school of mechanical engineering, he tried four times to enter the Faculty of Theatre in Prague, without success. He started his acting career as a supernumerary actor in the regional theatre in Teplice and continued to perform in regional theatres in Šumperk, Klatovy, and Pardubice. The first play that he wrote, Hodinový hoteliér, premiered at the Činoherní klub theatre in Prague on 11 May 1969.

In 1971, the communist regime banned him from film and television. He continued acting at Činoherní klub and other theatres. Landovský was one of the initiators of the human rights petition Charter 77 and along with Václav Havel and Ludvík Vaculík, was one of the three official spokesmen for the resulting civil rights movement. He was subsequently banned from working at the theatre. Constantly harassed by the secret police (Státní bezpečnost), during the winter of 1978–79, Landovský was accosted at night by an agent, severely beaten, and had his leg broken.    Feeling compelled to leave for his safety, when he was offered a position in the ensemble of the Burgtheater in Vienna, Austria, he accepted. While there, he participated in productions by Peter Zadek, among others.

After the Velvet Revolution, Landovský was able to return to Prague in January 1990. There he began to act again, performing regularly at the Theatre on the Balustrade, the National Theatre, Divadlo v Dlouhé, and Divadlo Hybernia between 1990 and 2008. He played one of the lead characters in Audience—written by his friend Václav Havel, who had recently been elected president of Czechoslovakia— at Činoherní klub. The play was directed by Jiří Menzel.

Landovský acted in a number of famous Czech films, including Closely Watched Trains, Marketa Lazarová, Adelheid, and Černí baroni.

Towards the end of his life, the actor suffered from diabetes and, after having had a stroke, used a wheelchair. He died at home in Kytín on 10 October 2014 from a heart attack, aged 78.

Selected filmography

References

External links

 

1936 births
2014 deaths
Charter 77 signatories
Czech male stage actors
Czech male film actors
Czech male television actors
Czech male dramatists and playwrights
Czechoslovak dissidents
Academy of Performing Arts in Prague alumni
People from Havlíčkův Brod
20th-century Czech dramatists and playwrights